Staro Selo is a village in the municipality of Glamoč in Canton 10, the Federation of Bosnia and Herzegovina, Bosnia and Herzegovina.

Demographics 

According to the 2013 census, its population was just 1, a Serb.

Footnotes

Bibliography 

 

Populated places in Glamoč